The .375 Viersco Magnum (9.5 x 87.5mm) is a rimless, magnum-length rifle cartridge designed for the hunting of large game and long-range competition shooting.  The case is engineered with a wider than typical .532" or .640" magnum base, increasing case volume to improve long-range performance.

References

Pistol and rifle cartridges